Thomas Davis House is a historic home located at Kenton, Kent County, Delaware.  The house was built about 1790, and is a two-story, five bay, center hall plan brick dwelling in the Federal style. It has a gable roof and the front facade features an entrance portico replaced in the early 20th century.  It has a rear wing added about 1840.  The wing is in the Greek Revival style.

It was listed on the National Register of Historic Places in 1983.

References

Houses on the National Register of Historic Places in Delaware
Federal architecture in Delaware
Greek Revival houses in Delaware
Houses completed in 1790
Houses in Kent County, Delaware
Kenton, Delaware
National Register of Historic Places in Kent County, Delaware